Wakefield Trinity Wildcats enter their 138th year of rugby league in 2010. They were in contention for the Super League, in its 15th season, and the 2010 Challenge Cup.

League table

2010 fixtures and results

Friendlies

Super League XV

Round 1
Wakefield Trinity Wildcats vs Catalans Dragons

2010 squad

2010 gains and losses

Gains
Ben Jeffries Bradford Bulls
Paul Johnson Warrington Wolves
Paul King Hull FC
Charlie Leaeno Canterbury Bulldogs
Daryl Millard Canterbury Bulldogs
Glenn Morrison Bradford Bulls
Terry Newton Bradford Bulls
Julien Rinaldi Bradford Bulls
Shane Tronc North Queensland Cowboys

Losses
Dave Halley Bradford Bulls
Steve Snitch Castleford Tigers
Tony Martin Crusaders RL
Frank Winterstein Crusaders RL
Oliver Wilkes Harlequins RL
Brad Drew Huddersfield Giants
Scott Grix Huddersfield Giants
Jay Pitts Leeds Rhinos
Ryan Atkins Warrington Wolves

References

Wakefield Trinity seasons
Wakefield Trinity Wildcats season